Jenny Rolland (born 7 January 1975) is a French gymnast. She competed in six events at the 1992 Summer Olympics.

References

External links
 

1975 births
Living people
French female artistic gymnasts
Olympic gymnasts of France
Gymnasts at the 1992 Summer Olympics
Sportspeople from Marseille
20th-century French women